Placentonema gigantissima is a giant nematode that parasitizes the placenta of the sperm whale. It was discovered in the 1950s around the Kuril Islands. The placentonema gigantissima develops its parasitic nature by utilizing nutrients found in the endometrium of female sperm whales and forming as spiriud (small, embroyonated) eggs. It can parasitize not only the placenta, but also the uterus, reproductive tract, mammary glands, or subdermis of the sperm whale.

References 

Nematodes described in 1951
Spirurida
Parasitic nematodes of mammals
Whales